Feock may refer to:

Feock, Cornwall, a village and civil parish south of Truro in Cornwall, United Kingdom
Feock, Zimbabwe, a village in the province of Mashonaland West, Zimbabwe